Abraham Everardus "Biem" Dudok van Heel (20 June 1914 – 2 December 1995) was a sailor from the Netherlands. He competed in the Dragon class at the 1948, 1952 and 1960 Olympics and finished in 8th, 6th and 13th place, respectively. He missed the 1956 Games due to their boycott by the Netherlands. In 1952 he sailed alongside his younger brother Michiel Dudok van Heel.

Sources

External links
 
 
 

1917 births
1995 deaths
Dutch male sailors (sport)
Olympic sailors of the Netherlands
Sailors at the 1948 Summer Olympics – Dragon
Sailors at the 1952 Summer Olympics – Dragon
Sailors at the 1960 Summer Olympics – Dragon
Sportspeople from Hilversum